The men's 4 × 400 metres relay event at the 2019 African Games was held on 30 August in Rabat.

Results

References

Relay
African Games